Bobby Brink (born July 8, 2001) is an American professional ice hockey right wing for the Lehigh Valley Phantoms in the American Hockey League (AHL) as a prospect to the Philadelphia Flyers of the National Hockey League (NHL). The Flyers selected him 34th overall in the 2019 NHL Entry Draft. He previously played college ice hockey for the University of Denver.

Playing career

Junior
During the 2018–19 season he recorded 35 goals and 33 assists in 43 games for the Sioux City Musketeers, averaging 1.29 points per game to rank 14th overall in USHL history. His 35 goals tied a Sioux City franchise record in a single season. Following an outstanding season he was named the 2019 USHL Forward of the Year.

Collegiate
Brink began his collegiate career for the Denver Pioneers during the 2019–20 season, where he finished second in NCHC rookie scoring with 24 points. He led all NCHC freshmen with 13 power-play points, and tied for third on the Pioneers in points per game with 0.86. Following the season he was named to All-NCHC Rookie Team.

During the 2021–22 NCAA season he recorded nine goals and 26 assists in conference play. The 35 points tied an NCHC single-season record. He was named the NCHC and National Player of the Month for February, after he recorded five goals and 10 assists in eight games, and had a career-long 14-game point streak from December 31 to February 19. He finished the season as the NCAA Scoring Champion with 57 points and 43 assists in 41 games. His 57 points were the most by a Denver player since Gabe Gauthier had 57 points in 2005, while his 43 assists were the most since Dave Shields also had 43 assists in 1990. Following an outstanding season, he was named a unanimous selection to the All-NCHC First Team, and was named NCHC Player of the Year and NCHC Forward of the Year. He was also named a Hobey Baker Award Hat Trick Finalist and an AHCA West First Team All-American.

Professional 
On April 10, 2022, Brink signed a three-year, entry-level contract with the Philadelphia Flyers of the National Hockey League (NHL), who had previously selected him 34th overall in the 2019 NHL Entry Draft. Brink recorded a point in his NHL debut, assisting on James van Riemsdyk's goal against the Washington Capitals in the Flyers' 9–2 loss on April 12, 2022.

International play

Brink represented the United States at the 2018 World Junior A Challenge where he won a gold medal and was named tournament MVP. He also represented the United States at the 2019 IIHF World U18 Championships where he recorded three goals and three assists in five games and won a bronze medal.

On December 23, 2019, he was named to the roster to represent the United States at the 2020 World Junior Ice Hockey Championships, where he recorded one goal and one assist in five games during the tournament. He again represented the United States at the 2021 World Junior Ice Hockey Championships, where he recorded two goals and four assists in seven games and won a gold medal.

Career statistics

Regular season and playoffs

International

Awards and honors

References

External links
 

2001 births
Living people
Ice hockey players from Minnesota
Denver Pioneers men's ice hockey players
Lehigh Valley Phantoms players
People from Minnetonka, Minnesota
Philadelphia Flyers draft picks
Philadelphia Flyers players
Sioux City Musketeers players
USA Hockey National Team Development Program players
AHCA Division I men's ice hockey All-Americans
NCAA men's ice hockey national champions